Carludovica palmata (Panama hat plant or toquilla palm) is a palm-like monocot plant. It is not a true palm. Its leaves are different from the leaves of true palms, and unlike true palms it does not develop a woody trunk. Its female flowers (which mature first) have large stigmas, and its male flowers (which mature later) have a lot of pollen.

The Panama hat palm is cultivated from Central America to Bolivia. Its soft, flexible, and durable fibers are used to weave Panama hats and other items.

References

Cyclanthaceae
Flora of Central America
Flora of South America
Plants described in 1798